Mediterranean Shipping Company S.A. (MSC) is an international shipping line founded by Gianluigi Aponte in Italy in 1970, with headquarters in Switzerland since 1978. The privately held company is owned by the Aponte family.  The company operates in all major ports of the world. 

Overview 
MSC operates 524 offices in 155 countries with its headquarters in Geneva, Switzerland and has over 100,000 employees. MSC's shipping line sails on more than 215 trade routes, calling at over 500 ports.

The company is independent and wholly owned by the Aponte family under the leadership of Diego Aponte. Diego was appointed President and CEO by his father and company founder Gianluigi in October 2014. In December 2020, Soren Toft became MSC Chief Executive Officer.

Since 1989, MSC has owned the holiday cruise division MSC Cruises.

MSC started train operations by taking over the cargo division of CP in 2015, and operates container trains over the Iberian peninsula.  Its rail operations have later expanded to Italy and beyond, under the name "Medway".

Cocaine-Smuggling
In 2022, MSC was reported to be a large transporter of smuggled drugs from South America to Europe.

History

Mediterranean Shipping Company (MSC) was founded in Naples in 1970 as a private company by seafaring captain Gianluigi Aponte when he bought his first ship, Patricia, followed by Rafaela, with which Aponte began a shipping line operating between the Mediterranean and Somalia. The line subsequently expanded through the purchase of second-hand cargo ships. By 1977, the company operated services to northern Europe, Africa and the Indian Ocean.

In 1978, the headquarters was established in Geneva, Switzerland.

The expansion continued through the 1980s; by the end of the decade, MSC operated ships to North America and Australia.

In 1988, MSC enter the cruise business by buying the liner Monterey.

In 1989, MSC bought Lauro Lines. The new company was named StarLauro Cruises and had 2 ships, Monterey and Achille Lauro.

In 1994, MSC ordered its first newly constructed ships, which were delivered beginning in 1996 with MSC Alexa. They were built by Italian shipbuilder, Fincantieri.

In 1995, StarLauro Cruises was renamed MSC Cruises.

In October 2014, Diego Aponte (son of MSC founder Gianluigi Aponte) was named president and chief executive of MSC, taking over from his father who was named group executive chairman. Gianluigi Aponte would continue to oversee all group related activities as well as supporting Diego in shaping the future of MSC.

In December 2014, the MSC shipping line ranked number 6 in Lloyd's List Top 100 Most Influential People in Shipping.

In January 2015, MSC launched the largest container ship, MSC Oscar, with a capacity of 19,224 TEU. Built by Daewoo Shipbuilding & Marine Engineering and registered in Panama, it joins the Albatross service in January as part of the 2M VSA (Vessel Sharing Agreement between Maersk Line and MSC).

In June 2015 Maersk and MSC signed a vessel-sharing agreement on the Asia-Europe, trans-Pacific and trans-Atlantic trades. The agreement is referred to as the 2M Alliance. The 2M Alliance includes 185 vessels with an estimated capacity of 2.1 million TEU, deployed on 21 strings.

In February 2017, MSC purchased a 49% stake into Messina Line, an Italian shipping Line founded in Genoa, Italy in 1929, specialised in intra Mediterranean short sea, and Europe to East and West Africa routes. The company owns 8 Roll-on/roll-off vessels and a Terminal in Genoa port, on top of a container fleet of 65,000 teu. MSC’s subsidiary Marinvest will take over a 49 percent stake in Ignazio Messina and a 52 percent stake in Ro-Ro Italia, a new company that would control four of the Messina’s roll-on/roll-off container vessels.

In October 2018, MSC decided to charter out the only two car carriers in its fleet (MSC Immacolata and MSC Cristiana) to Grimaldi Group, replacing them on the service towards West Africa with two Messina Line - ConRO vessels: MSC Cobalto (formerly Jolly Cobalto) and MSC Titanio (formerly Jolly Titanio).
The swap of these ships, that were previously deployed on MSC Adriatic Trade in between the ports of Trieste and Izmir, results in view of a tighter collaboration between MSC and Messina Line.

In December 2020, Søren Toft became MSC Chief Executive Officer. Søren Toft is the first person outside the Aponte family to become CEO. He will report directly to Diego Aponte, MSC Group President, and Gianluigi Aponte, founder and MSC Group Chairman. Søren Toft will also be a member of the board of directors of Terminal Investment Ltd.

In January 2021, MSC was awarded the “Maritime Sustainability Passport” (MSP) Certificate and Seal by the North American Marine Environment Protection Association (NAMEPA). NAMEPA’s Co-Founder/Executive Director Carleen Lyden Walker staded that “By qualifying for NAMEPA’s Maritime Sustainability Passport, MSC has demonstrated its commitment to stewardship of the environment, care for its employees, and responsible corporate governance”.

In April 2021, MSC launched a special shipping service to help the distribution of pharmaceutical products during the COVID-19 pandemic.

In August 2021, Gary Keville Transport Limited obtained temporary High Court order lifting an embargo preventing it from collecting and delivering containers from Dublin port.

In December 2021, MSC is offering at least 5.7 billion euros for Bolloré Africa Logistics, a subsidiary of the Bolloré group. In December 2022, it was announced MSC had completed the acquisition of Bolloré Africa Logistics.

On 6 January 2022, MSC became  the largest container shipping company in the world, surpassing Maersk, in terms of TEU capacity, according to the latest Alphaliner's figures.

2M Alliance: Maersk SeaLand/MSC 
In 2015, Maersk SeaLand and MSC launched the 2M Alliance, a vessel-sharing agreement (VSA) to ensure competitive and cost-efficient operations on the Asia-Europe, trans-Pacific and trans-Atlantic trades. The arrangement, which includes a series of slot exchanges and slot purchases on East-West routes, also involves Maersk Line and MSC taking over a number of charters and operations of vessels chartered to HMM. The 2M Alliance include 185 vessels with an estimated capacity of 2.1 million TEU, deployed on 21 strings. The 2M arrangement had a minimum term of 10 years with a 2-year notice period of termination. On 25 January 2023, CEO Vincent Clerc of A. P. Moller - Maersk and CEO Soren Toft of MSC announced in a joint press statement that the two shipping lines would terminate the 2M Alliance in January 2025.

Fleet 

Notable ships:

 MSC Beatrice
 MSC Bruxelles
 MSC Carmen
 MSC Carouge
 MSC Chicago
 MSC Cordoba
 MSC Danit
 MSC Geneva
 MSC Gülsün
 MSC Leigh 
 MSC Madeleine
 MSC Napoli
 MSC Nuria
 MSC Oscar
 MSC Pamela
 MSC Rosaria
 MSC Sindy
 MSC Zoe

Facts and accidents

MSC Carla 
On 24 November 1997, the container ship MSC Carla encountered heavy weather and broke apart NE of Azores in the North Atlantic Ocean, when on route to Boston, US from Le Havre, France. The 34 crew members were air-lifted by helicopter to safety. The fore part sank over a period of five days. The stern was towed to Spain where it was scrapped. In 1984, the previous owners of the MSC Carla (her name was MV Nihon at that time) lengthened the ship by 15 meters. This was accomplished by cutting the vessel in two and welding in a lengthening module. The structural failure was at the forward end of the new mid-body. The design and installation of the new structure by the shipyard was found to have been faulty.

MSC Napoli
On 18 January 2007, the container ship MSC Napoli was abandoned in the English Channel due to European storm Kyrill after severe gale-force winds and huge waves caused serious damage to Napoli'''s hull, including a crack in one side and a flooded engine room. All 26 crew were picked up from their lifeboat by Sea King helicopters of the Royal Navy's Fleet Air Arm and taken to Royal Naval Air Station Culdrose in Cornwall. On 19 January 2007, the ship was taken under tow but because of the ship’s deteriorating condition it was decided to beach the ship at Branscombe. On 9 July 2007 the MSC Napoli was refloated, but was immediately re-beached as a crack measuring 3 meters (9.8 ft) was found in the vessel's hull, running down both sides and through the keel. The decision was made to break the ship up near Branscombe beach.

MSC Nikita
On 29 August 2009, the container ship MSC Nikita was involved in a collision with the Nirint Pride off the Port of Rotterdam and was breached in the engine room. She was towed to Rotterdam for emergency repairs and subsequently declared a total loss. There were no casualties.

 MSC Chitra 
On 7 August 2010, the container ship MSC Chitra was involved in a collision with the bulk carrier MV Khalijia II while leaving Jawaharlal Nehru Port east of Mumbai in Navi Mumbai's Raigad district, India. The MV Khalijia II had ripped into MSC Chitra port side, creating three major dents in its hull and the engine room gradually flooded. After collision the MSC Chitra listed heavily and was grounded 8 km outside of the port. The Indian captain and 32 crew members were evacuated. On April 17, 2011, after the ship was declared a total loss, the MSC Chitra was scuttled by Titan Maritime approximately 385 miles off the coast of Mumbai, India.

MSC Zoe
On 1 January 2019, whilst on a voyage from Portugal to Bremerhaven carrying more than 8,000 containers the ship encountered severe weather causing her to roll violently.  345 containers went overboard into the North Sea near the Wadden islands off the Dutch coast. Of these, 297 containers were lost north of the Dutch island Ameland, the remaining containers some hours later north of the German island Borkum.

MSC Messina
On 24 June 2021, the container ship MSC Messina caught fire in the midway of the Indian Ocean halfway between Sri Lanka and Malacca Strait. The fire broke in the engine room of the ship, at some 480 nautical miles away from the Great Basses Reef Lighthouse, Kirinda.

MSC Danit
On 16 October 2021, the  container ship MSC Danit'' was boarded in the Port of Long Beach by the United States Coast Guard and National Transportation Safety Board marine casualty investigators. They were investigating an undersea pipeline that appeared to have been damaged by a ship's anchor and recently spilled oil onto the beaches of Orange County. MSC and ship owner, Dordellas Finance Corporation, and others were designated as parties of interest in the investigation.

See also

List of container shipping companies

References

External links

 

Shipping companies of Switzerland
Port operating companies
Companies based in Geneva
Transport companies established in 1970
Ro-ro shipping companies
Multinational companies headquartered in Switzerland
Container shipping companies